Dee Hartford (born Donna Higgins; April 21, 1928 - October 21, 2018) was an American television actress. She was married to Howard Hawks from 1953 to 1959. Her sister was actress Eden Hartford; her former brother-in-law was comedian Groucho Marx.

Early years
Born  in Salt Lake City, Utah, Hartford is the daughter of Edgar Higgins and Beatrice Higgins (née Thomas). She attended East High School in Salt Lake City and LDS Business College before becoming a model.

Career
Hartford initially achieved fame in the late 1940s as a model for Vogue.

Her screen debut was in A Girl in Every Port (1952), directed by Chester Erskine.  In 1964-65, she made three guest appearances on Perry Mason; as Leslie Ross in "The Case of the Accosted Accountant," as Lois Gray in "The Case of the Missing Button", and she played Rhonda Coleridge in "The Case of the Baffling Bug". In 1964, she also appeared in "The Bewitchin' Pool", (the last original episode of The Twilight Zone to be broadcast, but not the last one to be filmed).

Hartford also guest-starred in Gunsmoke, Burke's Law, The Outer Limits, The Alfred Hitchcock Hour, The Cara Williams Show, Batman (two episodes), Time Tunnel, Land of the Giants and Lost in Space (three episodes). She appeared as the android Verda in the 1966 Lost in Space episode "The Android Machine" and in a sequel, "Revolt of the Androids". She also appeared in a third episode of Lost in Space as Nancy Pi Squared in the “Space Beauty” episode about an intergalactic beauty pageant.

Personal life
Hartford married Howard Hawks on February 20, 1953, at his home in Hollywood, California.  They divorced in 1959. In 1972, she married Stuart Cramer III.

She was a member of the Church of Jesus Christ of Latter-day Saints, sometimes referred to as the Mormons.

References

External links
 

1928 births
2018 deaths
American film actresses
American television actresses
Actresses from Salt Lake City
20th-century American actresses
Latter Day Saints from Utah
Latter Day Saints from California
21st-century American women